Daniil Vyacheslavovich Kvyat (born 26 April 1994) is a Russian professional racing driver set to race for Prema Racing in the 2023 FIA World Endurance Championship. Kvyat last competed in Formula One between 2014–2017 and 2019–2020. He became the second Formula One driver from Russia and is the most successful of the four Russian drivers to date, with three podiums. 

He was runner-up at the 2012 Eurocup Formula Renault 2.0, and a champion in 2012 Formula Renault 2.0 Alps Series and 2013 GP3 Series. He made his debut in Formula One as a Toro Rosso driver in  finishing 15th in the World Championship. He then moved on to Red Bull Racing to partner Daniel Ricciardo for the 2015 season. He scored his first Formula One podium finish at the 2015 Hungarian Grand Prix, finishing second behind Sebastian Vettel. In his first season with Red Bull Racing, Kvyat finished 7th in the Drivers' Championship, ahead of his teammate. He started the 2016 season with Red Bull Racing, scoring his second podium, finishing third at the 2016 Chinese Grand Prix. However, following a controversial collision during the opening lap of his home race in Sochi, Kvyat was demoted to Toro Rosso ahead of the 2016 Spanish Grand Prix, where he finished the season and was retained by the team for the next season. Although consistently demonstrating solid qualifying performances in 2017, his season was plagued by various problems, including several retirements in races where he could have scored points. After the 2017 United States Grand Prix, Kvyat and Red Bull parted ways, effectively terminating his contract. Kvyat spent 2018 as a development driver for Scuderia Ferrari, before being re-signed by Toro Rosso for the  season. At the 2019 German Grand Prix Kvyat claimed the third podium of his career by finishing third; this was also Scuderia Toro Rosso's second podium finish after they won the 2008 Italian Grand Prix with Sebastian Vettel.

In 2021 he was a reserve driver for the Alpine F1 Team.

In 2022, Kvyat was entered to compete in the FIA World Endurance Championship for G-Drive Racing, but this team withdrew on 6 March in response to conditions introduced by the FIA following the 2022 Russian invasion of Ukraine. He called the restrictions "unfair and discriminatory". Kvyat drove at the Indianapolis Road Course race in the NASCAR Cup Series for Team Hezeberg on July 31.

Early life
Daniil Kvyat was born in Ufa, Bashkortostan, Russia, on 26 April 1994 to Vyacheslav and Zulfiya Kvyat. Vyacheslav Kvyat worked for Bashneft, initially as a mechanic at the Novo-Ufan refinery, but rose through the ranks to become the financial director of the export division until 1996. Later he branched out and worked with other energy companies, ending up as CFO of West Siberian Energy. At the same time he stood for election as a Deputy in the Bashkortostan state parliament.

Career

Karting (2005–2009)
In January 2005, Kvyat made his professional debut in motorsports winning his very first race in Sochi. During the 2005 and 2006 seasons, Kvyat participated in local events, including the Russian karting championship and cup as well as in the occasional races in Italy. Consistently demonstrating strong performances, he later moved to Italy to fully concentrate on racing in one of the most competitive environments. Kvyat's first professional team in Italy was Franco Pellegrini's crew.

During the winter of 2007, Kvyat's family moved to Italy to support his commitment demonstrated by his strong results. The young driver's parents stayed with him alternately, and he started education in Italian school, continuing to race in local tournaments. Before the start of the 2008 season, Kvyat, who had already proved himself in the Italian karting scene, signed a contract with the Zanardi factory team, led by well-known manager Dino Chiesa. Kvyat moved to the KF3 junior category and became a participant of the prestigious World Series Karting series. However, the Russian driver and Zanardi's partnership did not result in any success. He achieved European Championship qualification but Kvyat switched teams just before the championships started, to join privateers from Morsicani Racing, who used an FA Kart chassis. In their very first race, the new partnership produced an excellent result: Kvyat, who had tested the new kart of the new team just a couple of days before the start of the championship, not only made it to the finals but was fighting for the win.

Kvyat and Morsicani Racing won several prestigious competitions, including WSK rounds and the Bridgestone Cup. The Russian defeated his Zanardi ex-teammate, Nyck de Vries, who was now a protégé of the McLaren Formula 1 team. Kvyat also won the Trofeo delle Industrie, in the final heat of which Kvyat finished ahead of Antonio Giovinazzi and Rafaele Marchiello, future members of the Ferrari Academy.

Kvyat's European winning streak continued at the beginning of the 2009 season. The Morsicani Racing driver won the prestigious Winter Cup in the KF3 category and then added more victories to his name in the WSK rounds in Sarno and Le-Castellet. His victory in the Winter Cup was especially outstanding because he made it to the top of the podium after starting from the last position on the grid, where Kvyat found himself as a result of a clutch failure in qualifying. Kvyat first made his way into the final heat and then, starting from P3, he won that race, overtaking Carlos Sainz Jr along the way. Kvyat became one of the leaders in the WSK series, and began to draw the attention of sponsors. In the spring, he got backing from the Russian Lukoil company. However, the young driver was also noticed by Red Bull. During the summer, Kvyat participated in his first testing session in an open-wheel car, arranged by Red Bull alongside Carlos Sainz Jr, another candidate for the Red Bull Junior Team. Both drivers made a strong impression and signed contracts with the Austrian company.

Kvyat continued to race successfully in karting, taking the bronze at the 2009 European Championship one more time but was unable to reach the finals of the World Cup in Sarno. During the qualifying session slot, chosen for Kvyat by the team, it started to rain and his lap time was not fast enough in comparison with the times posted by drivers on the dry track. Improving his situation during the qualifying heats was barely possible, primarily because the team had decided to place their bets on their second driver, Italian Guliano Maria Niceta. Kvyat decided to part ways with Angelo Morsicani's team after the World Cup and joined the Intrepid factory team. He raced for Intrepid in the last two races of the WSK season, winning the final one. It was the last win of his career in karting as the Red Bull Junior Team bosses decided to progress Kvyat to the next level, straight into the cockpit of the Formula BMW car for the 2010 season.

Formula BMW (2010)

Before the start of the European season, Kvyat travelled to Malaysia with the Eurointernational team, which prepared cars for both the Red Bull juniors, to race in the Formula BMW Asian Championship, where he won his first race. However, his first races back in Europe were not very successful. Sainz, who had more tests under the belt before his debut in open-wheelers, was the first to deliver a result. However, by mid-season, Kvyat had improved his results. In Germany, he qualified in the front row for the first time and after that he finished every race in the points, including the final round in Monza, where he finished in 2nd place, making it to the podium for the first time during his debut European season. Two weeks later, Kvyat won a race in the Asian Championships in Singapore, a positive ending to his campaign in Formula BMW. The Bavarian company had earlier announced the closing of their open-wheel programme by the end of the 2010 season, so Kvyat could not continue to compete in the series.

Toyota Racing Series (2011)
Before the start of the 2011 season in Europe, Kvyat went for a pre-season boot camp in New Zealand to race in the Toyota Racing Series. He raced in four rounds for the Victory Motor Racing team, finishing fifth in the championship with a win in the Dan Higgins Trophy at Manfeild and another five podiums.

Formula Renault (2010–2012)

After two races with Koiranen Bros. Motorsport in 2010, in the Eurocup Formula Renault 2.0 finale at Barcelona and a fourth-place finish in the Formula Renault UK Winter Series, Kvyat, and his Formula BMW and Red Bull Junior teammate Carlos Sainz Jr., joined Koiranen for full 2011 seasons in both the Eurocup and the Formula Renault 2.0 Northern European Cup. He finished as runner-up behind Sainz, Jr. in the Northern European Cup standings with seven wins, including a hat-trick of wins at Monza. In the Eurocup he was outpaced by former Formula BMW rival Robin Frijns and Sainz, scoring two wins at Spa and the Nürburgring.

For 2012, Kvyat remained in the Formula Renault category, competing in both Formula Renault 2.0 Alps and the Eurocup Formula Renault 2.0 series. His debut in the Alps championship was marked with a dominating double win at Monza. In May he returned to the Eurocup, and recorded a double win in the opening round of the season at Motorland Aragón. In the Eurocup, Kvyat's main rival was Stoffel Vandoorne, who won four races versus Kvyat's six but he also never finished a single race below P4. Kvyat lost points at Nürburgring due to a wrong tyre choice by his team, and at Hungaroring after crashing with Oliver Rowland. The fate of the title was decided in the last round of the championship in Barcelona. Koiranen GP made a wrong call in the mixed conditions and selected wet tyres for Kvyat although the circuit was drying up after the rain; most of the other drivers on the grid started on slick tires. Thus, having lost several positions in the last part of the race, Kvyat did not score enough points to secure the title. In the Alps series, the Russian was fighting Norman Nato. Barcelona hosted the series finale just a couple of hours after the finish of the Eurocup race. Two title contenders crashed out and, having more overall points in the championship, Kvyat won the title. Russian driver remained with the Red Bull Junior Team and progressed to the GP3 Series for 2013.

GP3 and European Formula 3 (2013)

Kvyat spent 2013 competing in the GP3 Series with MW Arden and the European Formula 3 championship with Carlin Motorsport. Kvyat was a late registration for the latter series, and so he was ineligible for points. He scored five pole positions, seven podiums and a dominant win at Zandvoort. His first win saw an unusual mistake on the part of event organisers: there was no record of National Anthem of Russia present at Zandvoort, and "The Patriotic Song" by Mikhail Glinka was played instead to celebrate Kvyat's win. After this race he was offered a contract as a Formula 1 driver by Helmut Marko, head of the Red Bull Junior Team.

Carlos Sainz Jr joined Kvyat as a teammate once again in GP3, after a mediocre season in Formula 3. The season start was a challenge for both drivers: struggling to find appropriate settings for the cars, both Kvyat and Sainz failed in the season opener. They managed to catch up with the leaders after a few rounds, once the Arden engineers mastered management of the Pirelli tyres. Kvyat scored his first podium in the series at Hungaroring in July, then won the race in Spa in August to decrease the points deficit between him and the leaders in the drivers' standings. He went into the Abu Dhabi event being a title contender and finally won the championship in his debut year. His performance in two final feature races at Monza and Abu Dhabi was notable: Kvyat scored a pole, a win, led every lap and recorded the fastest lap, gaining the maximum points available at both races.

Formula One

Toro Rosso (2014)

Kvyat became the second driver of the Scuderia Toro Rosso (STR) Formula One team for the  season, alongside Frenchman Jean-Éric Vergne. He replaced Daniel Ricciardo, who moved to parent team Red Bull Racing. As a test driver for STR, he took part in Friday practice for the final two Grands Prix of the 2013 season, in the United States and Brazil. Kvyat made his F1 debut—aged just 19—in the 2014 Australian Grand Prix, where he made it into the top ten in qualifying and finished 9th in the race, breaking Sebastian Vettel's record as the youngest points-scorer in Formula One. He went on to score points in the Malaysian, Chinese, British and Belgian Grands Prix, finishing 15th in the World Championship. In September the organisers of the inaugural Russian Grand Prix announced their intention of naming a stand in the Sochi Autodrom after him.

Red Bull (2015–2016)

Kvyat was promoted to Red Bull for the  season, to replace the quadruple world champion Sebastian Vettel, who would move to Ferrari. He took his first podium in the sport with a second-place finish at the 2015 Hungarian Grand Prix, the highest finish for a Russian driver in Formula One. As a result, Kvyat – aged  – became the second-youngest driver to record a podium finish, after Vettel. In qualifying for the 2015 Japanese Grand Prix, Kvyat crashed heavily into the barriers, ultimately flipping the car. He was uninjured, and finished 13th in the race the following day. Kvyat ended the 2015 season with 95 points and 7th place in Drivers' World Championship, beating his race winning teammate Daniel Ricciardo by 3 points.

The 2016 season start was a challenge again, but Kvyat finished third in the third round, securing the first podium for Red Bull Racing in the new season. However, after an incident during the start of his home Grand Prix when Kvyat collided with Sebastian Vettel's car, team management decided to demote Kvyat back to Toro Rosso.

Toro Rosso second spell (2016–2017)

Kvyat spent some time adapting to the team and the new car, and returned to good shape, posting several strong performances in qualifying and races. It was announced ahead of the  that Kvyat had been re-signed to Toro Rosso for 2017 after much intense speculation.

Although the opening phase of the championship looked promising, with both the car and the drivers demonstrating solid speed, regularly making it into the top ten, Kvyat's season was plagued by multiple problems, including several retirements due to technical failures and occasional driver's mistakes. On 26 September 2017, Toro Rosso announced the decision to replace Kvyat for the forthcoming  with Frenchman Pierre Gasly, following a sustained run of underwhelming form from the Russian. Whilst confirming the decision to stand Kvyat down, in a statement, Toro Rosso added that the driver switch should not be considered a permanent parting of the ways, saying "This is not a case of goodbye for our Daniil, as he still remains part of the Red Bull Family." Despite securing a points finish it was not enough to secure his seat once more as Toro Rosso chose to continue with New Zealander Brendon Hartley and welcome the return of Gasly to complete the team's pair in preparation for Mexico. In the week between the United States and Mexican Grands Prix, it was confirmed by Helmut Marko that Kvyat would not return to the team and would be released out of the Red Bull driver development programme.

On the day of the Mexican Grand Prix, Williams technical director Paddy Lowe said that Williams were considering him as an option for the 2018 season.

Ferrari (2018)
After failing to attract a race seat for the 2018 season, Kvyat became the third driver for Ferrari. While mainly focusing on the team's simulator at Maranello, Kvyat drove the Ferrari SF71H for the first time at Fiorano, during a Pirelli wet weather test in April 2018.

Toro Rosso third spell (2019)

Kvyat rejoined Toro Rosso as a driver for the 2019 season, replacing the Red Bull-bound Pierre Gasly. This saw Kvyat race for the team he debuted in Formula One for a third time in his career. He initially raced alongside Thai driver Alexander Albon, who moved up from the FIA Formula 2 Championship. Kvyat put in strong performances during the first half of the season, achieving six points finishes from twelve races. However, he suffered consecutive retirements in China and Azerbaijan, both as a result of collision damage. His points finishes included 7th place in Monaco, a 9th place in Britain after starting from the back row of the grid and a shock 3rd-place podium finish at the rain-affected German Grand Prix. This came after a strategy call to pit for dry-weather tyres before the rest of the field and an overtake on Lance Stroll. This marked Kvyat's third career podium, and Toro Rosso's first podium since winning the 2008 Italian Grand Prix.

During the summer break prior to the Belgian Grand Prix, Kvyat's teammate Albon was promoted to Red Bull in August to replace Pierre Gasly, who was demoted back to Toro Rosso. Some questioned the decision not to promote Kvyat instead, as he had outperformed Albon during the first half of the season. Red Bull justified the move by saying they wished to trial Albon for the remainder of the season to decide who would partner Max Verstappen at the team in 2020. Kvyat produced an excellent drive in Belgium to finish in 7th place after starting in 19th due to power unit penalties. His third retirement of the season came at the next race in Italy after suffering an oil leak. Kvyat recorded three more points finishes in the remainder of the season; two 10th-place finishes in Japan and Brazil, and a 9th-place finish in Abu Dhabi. He also finished in the points in Mexico and the United States, but was handed post-race penalties for causing last-lap collisions in both races, dropping him out of the points. Kvyat finished the season in 13th place in the championship with 37 points.

AlphaTauri (2020)

AlphaTauri (previously Toro Rosso) retained Kvyat and Gasly for the 2020 season. Kvyat retired from the first race of the season (the 2020 Austrian Grand Prix) due to a suspension failure. He received his first point of the season at the Styrian Grand Prix with a tenth-place finish. He retired at the British Grand Prix after a heavy crash into the barriers that was caused by a tyre failure. Kvyat finished fourth in the 2020 Emilia Romagna Grand Prix after a succession of overtakes on Alexander Albon, Sergio Pérez and Charles Leclerc after the Safety car restart.

The Russian finished the season 14th in the standings with 32 points, compared to team-mate Pierre Gasly who scored 75 points and finished tenth. His contract was not renewed and Yuki Tsunoda replaced Kvyat at AlphaTauri for 2021.

Alpine (2021)
In 2021, Kvyat was the reserve driver for Alpine, alongside Zhou Guanyu.

FIA World Endurance Championship

2022 
Kvyat was entered to drive for G-Drive Racing in the LMP2 class in the FIA World Endurance Championship, alongside James Allen and Rene Binder.  However, G-Drive withdrew on 6 March, two weeks before the first race of the season, in response to conditions introduced by the FIA following the 2022 Russian invasion of Ukraine. Kvyat called the sanctions and restrictions against Russian athletes “unfair and discriminatory”.

2023 
Kvyat joined Prema Racing in the LMP2 class of the FIA World Endurance Championship in 2023, driving the No. 63 alongside Mirko Bortolotti and Doriane Pin. At the first race of the season Kvyat took a podium with third place.

NASCAR (2022-)
In December 2017 Kvyat tested a NASCAR Whelen Euro Series racecar at a young driver test. Throughout 2021 and 2022, Kvyat attended multiple NASCAR Cup Series events including at Martinsville Speedway and Road America, and appearing in multiple teams' garages.

Kvyat is due to make three starts in the NASCAR Cup Series for Team Hezeberg, with his car using the same number he used in Formula One, 26. He made his NASCAR debut in the 2022 Verizon 200 at the Brickyard at the Indianapolis Motor Speedway road course, finishing in 36th position after retiring from the race with suspension issues.

Personal life
Kvyat lived in Ufa, Russia, until 2000 when his family moved to Moscow. This is where he first raced go-karts before first moving to Western Europe and racing competitively. Kvyat currently lives in Monaco. In addition to his native Russian, he is also fluent in Italian, Spanish, and English, and has some ability in speaking Finnish and Dutch.

Rules introduced for the 2014 Formula One World Championship allowed the drivers to pick their own racing numbers that they will carry with them for the rest of their careers. When asked about which number he wanted, Kvyat revealed that 26 was the number he had chosen as he had no previous connection to it, and that he wanted to make it successful.

Kvyat's hobbies include table tennis, football, wakeboarding and skiing. He also likes heavy metal music, and has cited Metallica's "Whiskey in the Jar" cover and Motörhead's "Ace of Spades" as his two favourite songs. He plays the guitar.

Until November 2015, Kvyat was one of the few drivers in motor racing to have an FIA Super Licence, but not a regular driving licence in his native Russia.

In January 2017, Kvyat began dating Kelly Piquet, daughter of three-time F1 World Champion Nelson Piquet. The couple's first child, a daughter, was born in July 2019. The pair split in December 2019.

Karting record

Karting career summary

Racing record

Racing career summary

† As Kvyat was a guest driver, he was ineligible for points
*Season still in progress

Complete Formula BMW Europe results 
(key) (Races in bold indicate pole position; races in italics indicate fastest lap)

Complete Eurocup Formula Renault 2.0 results
(key) (Races in bold indicate pole position) (Races in italics indicate fastest lap)

† As Kvyat was a guest driver, he was ineligible for points.

Complete Toyota Racing Series results 
(key) (Races in bold indicate pole position; races in italics indicate fastest lap)

Complete Formula Renault 2.0 Alps Series results 
(key) (Races in bold indicate pole position; races in italics indicate fastest lap)
{| class="wikitable" style="text-align:center; font-size:90%"
! Year
! Team
! 1
! 2
! 3
! 4
! 5
! 6
! 7
! 8
! 9
! 10
! 11
! 12
! 13
! 14
! Pos
! Points
|-
| 2012
! Koiranen Motorsport
|style="background:#FFFFBF;"| MNZ1
|style="background:#FFFFBF;"| MNZ2
|style="background:#DFFFDF;"| PAU1
|style="background:#EFCFFF;"| PAU2
|style="background:#DFFFDF;"| IMO1
|style="background:#EFCFFF;"| IMO2
|style="background:#FFFFBF;"| SPA1
|style="background:#DFFFDF;"| SPA2
|style="background:#FFFFBF;"| RBR1
|style="background:#FFFFBF;"| RBR2
|style="background:#FFFFBF;"| MUG1
|style="background:#FFFFBF;"| MUG2
|style="background:#FFDF9F;"| CAT1
|style="background:#EFCFFF;"| CAT2
!style="background:#FFFFBF;"| 1st
!style="background:#FFFFBF;"| 217
|}

Complete FIA Formula 3 European Championship results
(key) (Races in bold indicate pole position; races in italics indicate fastest lap)

‡ As Kvyat was a guest driver, he was ineligible to score championship points.

 Complete GP3 Series results 
(key) (Races in bold indicate pole position; races in italics indicate fastest lap)

Complete Formula One results
(key) (Races in bold indicate pole position; races in italics indicates fastest lap)

 Did not finish, but was classified as he had completed more than 90% of the race distance.

NASCAR
(key) (Bold – Pole position awarded by qualifying time. Italics – Pole position earned by points standings or practice time. * – Most laps led.)

Cup Series

Xfinity Series

Complete FIA World Endurance Championship results
(key) (Races in bold indicate pole position) (Races in italics'' indicate fastest lap)

* Season still in progress.

References

Notes

External links

1994 births
Living people
Sportspeople from Ufa
Russian racing drivers
Formula BMW Pacific drivers
Formula BMW Europe drivers
Toyota Racing Series drivers
Formula Renault Eurocup drivers
British Formula Renault 2.0 drivers
Formula Renault 2.0 NEC drivers
Formula Renault 2.0 Alps drivers
FIA Formula 3 European Championship drivers
Russian GP3 Series drivers
GP3 Series Champions
Russian Formula One drivers
Toro Rosso Formula One drivers
Red Bull Formula One drivers
AlphaTauri Formula One drivers
EuroInternational drivers
Koiranen GP drivers
Arden International drivers
Carlin racing drivers
Karting World Championship drivers
Russian expatriate sportspeople in Monaco
FIA World Endurance Championship drivers
Prema Powerteam drivers